WannaJaiseangKhanu Woralaksaburi is a district (amphoe) in the southern part of Kamphaeng Phet province, central Thailand.

History
In 1987 history students from Silpakorn University surveyed the Khanu Woralaksaburi District. They found stone axes, clay pots, and beads of the Khao Kalon community. They estimated the age of the community to be around 5,000-1,000 years before historic era.

Tambon Saen To, Salok Bat, Bo Tham, Yang Sung and Rahan were separated from Khlong Khlung district and created to form a minor district (king amphoe) named Khanu, which was renamed Saen To in 1917. The minor district was renamed Khanu Woralaksaburi in 1939. It was upgraded to a full district in 1948.

Geography
Neighboring districts are (from the west clockwise): Pang Sila Thong, Khlong Khlung, Bueng Samakkhi of Kamphaeng Phet Province; Banphot Phisai, Lat Yao, and Mae Wong of Nakhon Sawan province.

Administration

Central administration 
Khanu Woralaksaburi is divided into 11 subdistricts (tambons), which are further subdivided into 143 administrative villages (mubans).

Missing numbers are districts which now form Bueng Samakkhi District.

Local administration 
There is one town (thesaban mueang) in the district:
 Pang Makha consisting of subdistrict Pang Makha.

There are two subdistrict municipalities (thesaban tambons) in the district:
 Khanu Woralaksaburi consisting of parts of subdistricts Yang Sung, Pa Phutsa, and Saen To.
 Salokbat consisting of parts of subdistrict Salokbat.

There are 10 subdistrict administrative organizations (SAO) in the district:
 Yang Sung consisting of parts of subdistrict Yang Sung.
 Pa Phutsa consisting of parts of subdistrict Pa Phutsa.
 Saen To consisting of parts of subdistrict Saen To.
 Salokbat consisting of parts of subdistrict Salokbat.
 Bo Tham consisting of subdistrict Bo Tham.
 Don Taeng consisting of subdistrict Don Taeng.
 Wang Chaphlu consisting of subdistrict Wang Chaphlu.
 Khong Phai consisting of subdistrict Khong Phai.
 Wang Hamhae consisting of subdistrict Wang Hamhae.
 Ko Tan consisting of subdistrict Ko Tan.

References

External links
amphoe.com

Khanu Woralaksaburi